Nana Jorjadze (born 24 August 1948) is an Academy Award nominated film director, scriptwriter and actress.

Jorjadze was born in Tbilisi, and graduated first from a local musical school (1966), and then from the architectural department at the Tbilisi State Academy of Fine Arts (1972). Having worked as an architect in the years 1968 to 1974, she enrolled in the Tbilisi State Theatre Institute which she completed in 1980. She debuted as an actress with the film Some Interviews on Personal Matters in 1977; and as a director with A Journey to Sopot in 1979. Her 1987 work Robinsonada or My English Grandfather was a breakthrough that won her the Caméra d'Or at the 1987 Cannes Film Festival, and both critical and popular acclaim. She moved to France early in the 1990s and directed several films including A Chef in Love (1996) which became the first, and so far the only, Georgian film to be nominated for the Academy Award.

She is married to fellow Georgian writer and director Irakli Kvirikadze, who previously went by the name Irakli Mikhailovich Kvirikadze.

Filmography

 As director
 Mogzauroba Sopotshi (1979)
 Atlant (1979)
 Momekhmaret ialbuzze asvlashi (TV Movie)  (1981)
 Erosi (1984)
 Robinsonada or My English Grandfather (1987)
 Encounters (1993)
 Château de la napoule (1993)
 About Georgia (1993)
 A Chef in Love (1996) as Nana Djordjadze
 27 Missing Kisses (2000) as Nana Djordjadze
 Tolko ty... (TV Mini-Series) (2004)
 The Rainbowmaker (2008)
 Moskva, ya lyublyu tebya!  (2010)
 My Mermaid, My Lorelei (2013)
 Prime Meridian of Wine Géorgie (2016) (Documentary)
 As writer
 Mogzauroba Sopotshi (1979)
 Atlant (1979)
 Momekhmaret ialbuzze asvlashi (TV Movie)  (1981)
 Erosi (1984)
 Encounters (1993)
 Château de la napoule (1993)
 About Georgia (1993)
 A Chef in Love (1996) as Nana Djordjadze
 27 dakarguli kotsna (2000) as Nana Djordjadze
 As costume designer
 Atlant (1979)
 Mogzauroba Sopotshi (1979)
 As set designer
 Mogzauroba Sopotshi (1979)

References

Notes
Mikaberidze, Alexander (ed., 2007). Jorjadze, Nana. Dictionary of Georgian National Dictionary. Retrieved on December 9, 2007.

External links

 Nana Djordjadze. Geocinema.Org.Ge, Retrieved on December 9, 2007.

1948 births
Living people
Actors from Tbilisi
Women film directors from Georgia (country)
Soviet women film directors
Soviet film directors
Soviet screenwriters
Film directors from Georgia (country)
Film actresses from Georgia (country)
Women screenwriters
20th-century actresses from Georgia (country)
20th-century women writers from Georgia (country)
20th-century writers from Georgia (country)
Directors of Caméra d'Or winners